The Great Seungri is the debut Korean studio album by South Korean singer Seungri. It was released on July 20, 2018 by YG Entertainment and Genie Music. It is available in two versions and contains nine tracks, with "1, 2, 3!" as its lead single and "Where R U From" as its subtitle. This is also his final Korean release before his retirement in 2019.

Background and release 
In January 2018, Seungri revealed that he had prepared a solo album alongside solo concerts.

On July 2, the name and release date of the album was officially announced. On July 20, the music video for lead single "1, 2, 3!"  was released, which was inspired by the film Grease. Meanwhile the music video for the sub-title, "Where R U From" (featuring Mino) was released several days after the album release date.

Packaging 
The physical CD album was released in two different versions: melon and orange. The album includes album cover, 2 CDs, lyrics book, photo book, photo card, selfie photo card, postcard, coaster, sticker, flyer, and double-sided poster.

Promotion 
On June 4, it was announced through YGEX that Seungri will be holding his first solo concert in Korea. The concert will be held at the Jangchung Gymnasium on August 4 and 5 and will be titled Seungri 2018 1st Solo Tour 'The Great Seungri' in Seoul.

To promote the album, Seungri appeared on several television programs, including jTBC's Idol Room, broadcast on July 24, 2018.

Track listing

Charts

Sales

Release history

References

2018 debut albums
Seungri albums
YG Entertainment albums